Anima Animus is the third studio album by British duo the Creatures, consisting of Siouxsie Sioux and musician Budgie, released in 1999. The title of the album was inspired by Carl Jung's concept of anima and animus ("the woman inside the man, the man inside the woman").

Recorded in France and England, the album was a departure from previous Creatures works. While still retaining a percussive element, the music had a more urban sound. Upon its release, the record was well received by critics.

Anima Animus was later hailed by peer PJ Harvey, who selected it in her Top 10 Albums of 1999.

History and music
The pair began developing ideas for the songs in 1995. "Exterminating Angel" was composed that autumn in France. Siouxsie and Budgie had purchased a lot of equipment and decided to work at their house near Toulouse. The original title of the album was Gifthorse, then Mount Venus, before the duo changed their minds to finally opt for Anima Animus, which was a reference to Jung's theory of "The Man Inside The Woman and The Woman Inside The Man". In 1996, no major label was interested in the demos, as they were judged as too avant-garde and not commercial enough. Siouxsie and Budgie then decided to finance the project themselves, and began recording on their own. They produced the album with the assistance of Steve Lyon, Steve Levine and Warne Livesey. Four songs ("2nd Floor", "Another Planet", "Say" and "I Was Me") were recorded in England. While staying in London, they met Doug Hart, who owned an independent label, Hydrogen Records. With his help, the Creatures set up their own label called Sioux Records, and became an independent act. The album was finally mixed in New York. The portraits of Siouxsie and Budgie for the sleeves were designed and conceived by French artists Pierre et Gilles in Paris in 1997.

Lucy O'Brien described "2nd Floor" as "a driving, thumping dancefloor thing that exudes a brooding glamour". Siouxsie said that the song was about the state a person was after having too many Vodka Gimlets. "It's when you still want more, when you want the party to continue and it's beyond being sensible. I remember times when I was the one person left in a place, and the euphoria that goes along with it. '2nd Floor' was my idea of what a private drinking bar would be, that was open all the time." She also stated that "There's something very religious about bars. They're like altars. The lighting. The colour of the bottles. Having a drink. It's like Santa's Grotto time."  "Don't Go to Sleep Without Me" is a "ghostly lullaby".

Release
The first single, "2nd Floor", was issued in late 1998, shortly after the four-track EP Eraser Cut. The second single, "Say", featured two unreleased B-sides: the acoustic "Broken" and the atmospheric "All She Could Ask For". The latter song opened their 1999 concerts. All of this extra material was later included on the U.S. Retrace compilation.

Anima Animus was released on both CD and double 10-inch vinyl record. The album was also released on Spotify.

Critical reception

The album was well received by critics. The Times gave it 8 out of 10 and wrote: "Siouxsie, has rarely been in better voice. The opening track, "2nd Floor" is a fantastically knowing melodrama, riding a techno pulse, while the ominous, epic "Exterminating Angel" pursues its prey in lamplit streets. It's entrancing, hypnotic and inventive". The Sunday Times praised it in glowing terms: "Siouxsie's voice has lost none of its ability to seduce and unsettle. The sound is percussive, defined by Budgie's supple rhythm work. "Exterminating Angel" is exquisitely menacing, while the sinuous "Another Planet" grows to a shuddering climax." Uncut reviewer Chris Roberts rated the album 4 out of 5, saying: "Sioux's always been at her best as a harsh declaimer [...] but there are phases where she whispers, breathes, reaches for vulnerability", before concluding "The Creatures have jettisoned comfort and are phoning home from a new end zone. Anima Animus crackles."

Track listing
All songs written and composed by Siouxsie and Budgie.
"2nd Floor"
"Disconnected"
"Turn It On"
"Take Mine"
"Say"
"I Was Me"
"Prettiest Thing"
"Exterminating Angel" (mixed by Juno Reactor)
"Another Planet"
"Don't Go to Sleep Without Me"

Personnel
The Creatures
Siouxsie Sioux - vocals, drone, koto zither and toy piano
Budgie - drums, percussion, marimba, synthesizer, guitar and organ
Additional musicians
Knox Chandler - "atmospheric" guitar
 Polly Chilcott - cello on "I Was Me"

References

1999 albums
The Creatures albums